Oak Hall is an unincorporated community in the city of Fitchburg, Dane County, Wisconsin, United States. It is located at the intersection of Fish Hatchery Road (County Highway D) and County Highway M just north of the town and village of Oregon. Once part of the Town of Fitchburg, it became part of the city of Fitchburg when it was incorporated in 1983. The area remains distinct from the neighborhoods being built near it.

See also
 Fitchburg Center, Fitchburg, Wisconsin

Notes

Unincorporated communities in Dane County, Wisconsin
Unincorporated communities in Wisconsin